The 102nd Prince of Wales's Own Grenadiers was an infantry regiment of the British Indian Army. It could trace its origins to 1796, when it was raised as the 13th Battalion, Bombay Native Infantry.

The Grenadiers were part of the Indian army which was sent to Egypt in 1801, to fight against the Napoleonic Campaign in Egypt in the French Revolutionary Wars. In 1818, the regiment's soldiers fought in the Peshwa Wars, distinguishing themselves at the Battle of Koregaon in the Third Anglo-Maratha War.

In 1824 when it became a regiment in its own right, when it was named the 2nd or Grenadier Regiment of Bombay Native Infantry.

In 1840, it took part in the First Afghan War and then the 1868 Expedition to Abyssinia which was a punitive expedition carried out by armed forces of the British Empire against the Ethiopian Emperor Tewodros II of Ethiopia. In 1880, the unit took part in the Battle of Maiwand during the Second Afghan War. The regiment was stationed in Mhow, when in October 1902 it was order to go to Berbera, to fight in the Somaliland Campaign.

World War I began with it being stationed at Muscat, Oman and served in the Mesopotamia Campaign with the 14th Indian Division, taking part in the Second Battle of Kut and the Fall of Baghdad (1917). A second battalion was raised in 1917 that served in the Sinai and Palestine Campaign. 

After World War I the Indian government reformed the army, moving from single battalion regiments to multi-battalion regiments. In 1922, the 102nd Prince of Wales's Own Grenadiers became the 2nd Battalion, 4th Bombay Grenadiers.

Designations

References

Moberly, F.J. (1923). Official History of the War: Mesopotamia Campaign, Imperial War Museum. 

British Indian Army infantry regiments
Bombay Presidency
Grenadier regiments